Al Qusaidat is a suburb of the city of Ras Al Khaimah in the United Arab Emirates (UAE). It is the location of RAK Hospital, as well as the city's Public Works Department.

References 

Populated places in the Emirate of Ras Al Khaimah